Diana Ureche (born 19 October 1974) is a Romanian butterfly and freestyle swimmer. She competed in five events at the 1992 Summer Olympics.

References

External links
 

1974 births
Living people
Romanian female butterfly swimmers
Romanian female freestyle swimmers
Olympic swimmers of Romania
Swimmers at the 1992 Summer Olympics
Place of birth missing (living people)